Beaver Falls is a British comedy-drama that follows a trio of Oxford Brookes University graduates who managed to deceitfully get jobs at Beaver Falls, an elitist American summer camp for the beautiful teenage offspring of California's rich and powerful.

The first episode aired on E4 at 27 July 2011. The show was renewed for a second and final series, which began airing on 6 August 2012, also on E4.

On 22 September 2012, it was reported that E4 had cancelled Beaver Falls.

Plot
Series One

Flynn, Barry and Adil (A-Rab) fly out to a summer camp in California hoping for two months of sun, booze, and gorgeous horny women. But their dream turns into what seems to be a nightmare when they're appointed to look after a cabin full of social misfits. Generally known as the 'Chunk Bunk' their cabin is terrorized by the jock cabin. Flynn's mission is to sleep with every woman that he can without getting caught, A-Rab wants to get over the girl of his dreams, and Barry just wants to meet a girl. Unbeknownst to A-Rab and Barry, Flynn is actually in America because he has Motor Neurone Disease (the same disease that affected Stephen Hawking) and is aware that he may not have long to live.

By the end of the series, A-Rab has successfully left his ex-girlfriend in the past, and instead fallen for Rachael, the camp's guidance counsellor, but is let down regardless after discovering that she sympathetically slept with Flynn after he confessed his condition to her. Kimberley leaves Jake in Barry's favour, and has sex with him during the last night at the camp. Flynn contemplates suicide when he realises that he has betrayed A-Rab, and because he is afraid of how far his condition will take him, but ultimately chooses to face up to his future, and reconciles with A-Rab (after accepting a punch in the face).

Series Two

The trio return to Beaver Falls, hoping for another relaxed summer as Flynn's time ticks by, having now lost the use of his right arm to his condition. Flynn begins to fall for PJ, the camp-owners' daughter, Barry is thrilled to find that Kimberley is looking for a full relationship with him as long as he is in the country, and A-Rab attempts to reconcile with Rachael, only to learn that she is now married to the bumbling but well-meaning Mac. A rift is formed between the trio when A-Rab challenges Barry over his unreliable nature after Barry drunkenly rats A-Rab out to the police in the wake of a petty crime, and A-Rab instead comes to rely on Hope, a lively and cheerful – but completely untrustworthy – girl who only worsens the matter when she reveals Flynn's condition to the entire camp.

By the end of the series, Barry has learned to take more responsibility for his actions after he was mistakenly led to believe that Kimberley was pregnant. However, Jake, despite initially returning to the camp with a considerably more benevolent outlook on life, ultimately attempts to steal Kimberley back from Barry; though she rejects Jake, Barry chooses to stay as just a friend to her when he realises that she isn't ready for a serious commitment. Mac comes out as gay after a deep conversation with Barry, leading A-Rab and Rachael to reconcile; although this at first provokes a psychotic rampage from Hope, who has become obsessed with A-Rab, she eventually calms down when she realises that A-Rab has no interest in her, but, continues to try and ensure Beaver Falls is closed down. Flynn and PJ fall in love and impulsively decide to marry at the camp, with Flynn vowing to stay in America with her rather than return to Britain, and although the wedding is abruptly halted when Flynn confesses that he had slept with her mother the year before, the couple are ultimately married.

The show ends with Flynn and PJ driving off as the newly married couple. Barry, A-Rab, Rachel, Mac, and Kimberly swim in the lake – Mac decides to return to England with Barry and A-Rab – while Barry suggests they crash Flynn's honeymoon.

Cast and characters

Main

Recurring

Episodes

Series Overview

Series 1: 27 July 2011 to 31 August 2011 (6 Episodes)
Series 2: 6 August 2012 to 10 September 2012 (6 Episodes)

Series 1 (2011)

Series 2 (2012)

Production
Filming began in February 2011 in South Africa. John Dagleish stated that Beaver Falls was like The O.C. but with British humour. He also talked about fellow E4 show The Inbetweeners, "The Inbetweeners is great and it was a massive success so if we can replicate that we'll be really happy. If we can get half the success they get we'll be chuffed." A second series was confirmed in October 2011.

Broadcast
The first series underperformed only averaging 400,000 viewers an episode. However, it was the third most popular title on 4oD in August 2011 with 1.4m views. The second series premiered to 281,000 viewers, failing to match E4's slot average of 355k (1.94%), in the face of stiff competition from the BBC's Olympics coverage.

Reception
Critical reception has been mixed, with critics comparing Beaver Falls to The Inbetweeners, but stating that it falls some way short of comical brilliance. Christopher Hooton of Metro felt that it was the usual teen comedy; the irresistible ladies man, the awkward virgin, the high school jock, the fat kid, the hot woman. Hooton also added "Beaver Falls is essentially a textbook covered in pencil-drawn penises, it was funny once upon a time but that time has passed." Rachel Tarley of Metro stated: "Beaver Falls is shaping up to be a silly, lewd and pretty juvenile series, but with so much heart at its core, it's hard not to warm to these hapless characters and their stories."

Home releases
The first series was released on DVD in Region 2 on 13 August 2012.

References

External links
 Official Beaver Falls website
 
 
 
 Beaver Leaks

2010s British comedy-drama television series
2011 British television series debuts
2012 British television series endings
British comedy-drama television shows
E4 (TV channel) original programming
Television series by All3Media
Television shows set in California
2010s British sex comedy television series
E4 sitcoms
Channel 4 television dramas
English-language television shows